Aleksander Sewruk (17 January 1912 – 23 November 1974) was a Polish actor. He appeared in more than 20 films between 1954 and 1974. At the 1st Moscow International Film Festival he won a Silver Medal for acting for his role in the film The Eagle.

Selected filmography
 Ashes and Diamonds (1958)
 Night Train (1959)
 The Eagle (1959)

References

External links

1912 births
1974 deaths
Polish male film actors
Recipients of the Order of Polonia Restituta
20th-century Polish male actors
Recipient of the Meritorious Activist of Culture badge